Bare House and Mill is a historic home and grist mill ruins located at Stuarts Draft, Augusta County, Virginia. The house was built about 1857, and is a two-story, three bay brick dwelling with Greek Revival and Italianate style design influences. It has a metal-sheathed hipped roof one-story entry porches on the front and rear. Also on the property are a contributing wellhouse and meathouse (c. 1860), barn (c. 1900, 1998), privy, cistern, and pumphouse.  The ruins of the Bare Mill and related mill race and piers are also located on the property.  The two-story, stone grist mill was built about 1800, and may have shut down after the floods of September 1870.

It was listed on the National Register of Historic Places in 2002.

References

Houses on the National Register of Historic Places in Virginia
Greek Revival houses in Virginia
Italianate architecture in Virginia
Houses completed in 1857
Houses in Augusta County, Virginia
National Register of Historic Places in Augusta County, Virginia
1857 establishments in Virginia